Yaroslavl is the name of several inhabited localities in Russia.

Urban localities
Yaroslavl, a city in Yaroslavl Oblast

Rural localities
Yaroslavl, Kirov Oblast, a village in Zakarinsky Rural Okrug of Slobodskoy District in Kirov Oblast; 
Yaroslavl, Smolensk Oblast, a village under the administrative jurisdiction of Yelninskoye Urban Settlement in Yelninsky District of Smolensk Oblast